Milad Kamandani is an Iranian football player who currently plays for Iranian side Nassaji Mazandaran in the Persian Gulf Pro League as an attacking midfielder.

Club career

Persepolis
He joined Rah Ahan training camp after 2012–13 Tehran U-19 Pro League finishing with Moghavemat Tehran U21. He passed technical test and chosen by the head coach Ali Daei to be part of team's first team during 2013–14 Iran Pro League, but he not signed with Rah Ahan and joined Persepolis training camp after Ali Daei becomes Persepolis' head coach.
He trained with Persepolis for three days and participated in training match against Tractor Sazi. He promoted to the first team on 11 July 2013 with signing a five-year contract. He played for Persepolis U21 in AFC Vision Asia U-21 Tehran Premier League. He made his debut for Persepolis against Sepahan in week 25 of 2013–14 Iran Pro League.

Club career statistics

International career

Iran U–20
He was called up to the Iran U–20 team by Ali Doustimehr in November 2013.

Iran U–23
He was called up to the Iran U–23 team by Nelo Vingada in June 2014.

Honours

Club
Persepolis
Iran Pro League runner-up: 2013–14, 2015–16
Shahre khodro fc
Iran Pro League: 2015–2016, 2017
Malavan club 
Azadegan league : 2017, 2018

International
Iran Olympic
WAFF U-23 Championship: 2015

References

1994 births
Living people
Iranian footballers
Persepolis F.C. players
Iran under-20 international footballers
Association football midfielders
People from Karaj
21st-century Iranian people